Groenten uit Balen is a 2011 Belgian drama film based on the eponymous play by Walter van den Broeck.

Cast 
 Stany Crets as Jan Debruycker
 Evelien Bosmans as Germaine Debruycker
  as Clara Debruycker
  as Opa Debruycker
 Clara Cleymans as Alice
  as Rik
  as Luc Verheyen
  as Mevrouw Verheyen
 Koen De Bouw as Mijnheer Verheyen
 Lucas Van den Eynde as Piet Populiers
 Axel Daeseleire as Marcel

References

External links 

2011 drama films
2011 films
Belgian drama films
2010s Dutch-language films